Elvin Jones Jazz Machine Live at Pit Inn is a live album by drummer Elvin Jones' Jazz Machine recorded in Japan in 1984 and originally released on the Japanese Polydor label.

Reception
The Allmusic review awarded the album three stars and stated "Live at Pit Inn is not an essential recording but a welcome addition to the extensive Jones discography".

Track listing
 "George and Me" (Elvin Jones) - 10:26
 "Shinjitsu" (Keiko Jones) - 14:40
 "My One and Only Love" (Guy Wood, Robert Mellin) - 12:44
 "Zange" (Keiko Jones) - 13:56
 "E.J.'s Blues" (Elvin Jones) - 5:49 Bonus track on CD

Personnel
Elvin Jones  - drums
Sonny Fortune - tenor saxophone, flute
Pat LaBarbera - tenor saxophone, soprano saxophone
Fumio Karashima - piano 
Richard Davis - bass

References

Elvin Jones live albums
1984 live albums
Polydor Records live albums